Thomas James Leehane (14 February 1928 – 11 April 2019) was an Australian rules footballer who played with Carlton and Essendon in the Victorian Football League (VFL).

Leehane started out at Carlton in 1945, playing for the thirds. He only played one senior game for them, in the 1948 VFL season. After not featuring in the 1949 season, Leehane crossed to Essendon and appeared in four games in 1950 and another three in 1951.

In 1952, Leehane played with Port Melbourne and was member of their 1953 premiership team. The following year he captain-coached Boort to a premiership and would also coach St Arnaud to a premiership in 1958.

References

1928 births
Australian rules footballers from Victoria (Australia)
Carlton Football Club players
Essendon Football Club players
Port Melbourne Football Club players
2019 deaths